Carioca Arena 1 (Portuguese: Arena Carioca 1) is an indoor stadium in Barra da Tijuca in the west zone of Rio de Janeiro, Brazil. The venue hosted basketball at the 2016 Summer Olympics as well as wheelchair basketball and wheelchair rugby at the 2016 Summer Paralympics. As with a number of other venues in the Barra Olympic Park, Carioca Arena 1 was transformed after the games to become part of the Olympic Training Centre.

Construction

Construction on the arena began in July 2013. The arena covers 38 thousand square meters. The arena's capacity for the 2016 Summer Olympics was 16,000 spectators. However, it was lowered to 6,000 after the Olympics. The facade has a height of 33 meters, and its shape is inspired by the mountainous landscape of the city. The track was built with two types of wood, one for a different track and to the surrounding area, as well as a system for absorbing blows of the sport. The arena has 282 rooms, 49 bathrooms, eight dressing rooms and six lifts.

The estimated cost for the planned complex of three arenas (Carioca 1, Carioca 2 and Carioca 3), the IBC, MPC, a hotel, and the structure of the Olympic Park was 1.678 billion Brazilian reais, including part of the public initiative and private money. This was handled between the Prefecture of Rio de Janeiro and the private sector.

The work was completed in January 2016. As a part of the arena's opening events, there was the Basketball Tournament International Women Aquece River, held from 15 to 17, January 2016, and the International Championship of Wheelchair Rugby Rio Aquece, held from 29 to 31 January, 2016.

Major sporting events hosted

See also
 Carioca Arena 2
 Carioca Arena 3

References

External links

Indoor arenas in Brazil
Sports venues in Rio de Janeiro (city)
Olympic basketball venues
Basketball venues in Brazil
Barra Olympic Park
Sports venues completed in 2016